Renée Watson is an Australian-born science communicator and entrepreneur. She is the founder of The Curiosity Box.

Background 
Born in Queanbeyan, Australia, Watson attended the Australian National University, graduating in 2000 and moved to the UK the same year. In 2008, Watson founded a business called WATS.ON, an association development company which worked with scientific societies and associations, helping them become sustainable and increase outward looking, high-impact work.

The Curiosity Box 
The Curiosity Box is an Oxfordshire-based company and the UK's first STEM subscription box,  providing science-oriented activities for children aged 7 to 11. It began as a Kickstarter campaign in 2016. Watson then won the 2017 Women In Science England (WISE) Toy Award for the creation of The Curiosity box and awarded Let Toys Be Toys 'Toymark' Good Practice Award

Talks and interviews 
 TEDxAthens: ‘Is curiosity the secret to a wonder-filled life?’
 Bustle Six Women in STEM to Watch Out for in 2018
 Top Hat: This Entrepreneur Is Making Kids Fall in Love With Science
 Humans in Business blogpost: Meningitis to Melinda: My 2018
 Goldieblox - STEM role model call: 10 inspiring women in STEM
 Adafruit celebrating the work of Renée Watson scientist & educator on Ada Lovelace Day
 Stories from Science: Ep 8 – Destination Detonation: Renee Watson and her journey to The Curiosity Box
 Muddy Stilettos: Real Resolutions 2018
 Enterprising Oxford: Entrepreneurs Uncovered
 Critchleys Conversation: Local Business Heroes

Awards 
Watson has won numerous awards for her work, including Institute of Directors Director of the Year London & South Finalist Innovation 2019, and 2018,
Inclusive Tech Alliance Diversity in Tech, Entrepreneur of the Year Winner 2019
Tech Alliance UK Entrepreneur award Nominated,
Blenheim Start Up Finalist 2018,
WISE Toy of the Year award winner 2017
Business Magazine Spotlight on Women in STEM finalist Sep 2017, and
WOBA Innovation Award winner 2017.

References

External links 
 Curiosity Box webpage

21st-century Australian businesspeople
Australian National University alumni
Year of birth missing (living people)
Living people
Science communicators